Rockpoint P.D. is a Canadian television sitcom, which aired on The Comedy Network in 2003. Filmed primarily in Langley, British Columbia, the series centred on the police department in the fictional city of Rockpoint.

The cast included Randy Schooley, Catherine Lough Haggquist, Simon Hayama, Jennifer McLean, D. Neil Mark and Boyan Vukelic. Dave Aitken, a former Langley police officer, served as a script consultant alongside his work in the same role for the drama series Cold Squad.

Only one season of 13 episodes was produced, and premiered in January 2003. The full series was rerun in fall.

References

External links

2000s Canadian sitcoms
2003 Canadian television series debuts
2003 Canadian television series endings
CTV Comedy Channel original programming
Television shows filmed in British Columbia
Television shows set in British Columbia